Nick Kirk was Dean of Nelson: from 2011 A former nurse, he was previously the incumbent at Christ Church, Wanganui.

Kirk had motor neuron disease. He died in Wanganui on 24 June 2017.

References

20th-century births
2017 deaths
Deans of Nelson
Year of birth missing
People from Whanganui